Methamnetamine (also known as methylnaphetamine, MNA, MNT and PAL-1046) is a triple monoamine releasing agent and N-methyl analog of the non-neurotoxic experimental drug naphthylaminopropane and the naphthalene analog of methamphetamine. It has been sold online as a designer drug.

It acts as a releasing agent of serotonin, norepinephrine, and dopamine, with EC50 values of 13 nM, 34 nM, and 10 nM, respectively.

Legal status
Methamnetamine is illegal in Japan.

See also 
 2-MAPB
 BMAPN
 Naphthylaminopropane
 HDEP-28
 HDMP-28
 Naphyrone
 WF-23

References 

Methamphetamines
Designer drugs
Entactogens and empathogens
2-Naphthyl compounds
Serotonin receptor agonists
Serotonin-norepinephrine-dopamine releasing agents
Stimulants